Mizque (from Quechua: misk'i, meaning "sweet") is a province in the Cochabamba Department, Bolivia. Its capital is Mizque.

The province, in 1992, had a population of  27,959 inhabitants, mostly indigenous citizens of Quechuan descent. In 2001, the population increased to 36,181 inhabitants and it was estimated at 41,062 in 2005.

Geography 
Mizque Province is home to a great diversity of ecoregions because it contains a wide variety of topographic features with heights ranging between 2,000 and 3,600 m. The province belongs to the Julpe-Mizque basin with an area of 3,845 km2.

The main rivers are:
 Mizque River, 75 km
 Julpe River, 60 km
 Uyuchama River, 50 km
 Tuqma River, 45 km
 Kari Kari River, 42 km
 Vicho Vicho River, 32 km

Although there is a large amount of superficial and sub-superficial water within the province, the zone is suffering from drought due to the lack of irrigation systems.

Some of the highest mountains of the province are listed below:

Climate 
The climate is dry. There are a few irregular rainfalls and long periods of drought. The medium annual temperature varies between 16 and 18 °C. During the rainy season ("summer"), corresponding to the months from December to March, the province receives 87% of the annual precipitation, in December and January alone 57%, often occurring as hailstorms. During the dry season ("winter") the temperature goes down radically and snowfalls occur. The annual precipitation is between 300 and 700 mm, reaching 507 mm annually on an average.

Flora 
The semiarid and arid regions are covered with plants which are tolerant towards dry conditions. 75% of the total area of Mizque Province is cultivated.

Fauna 

The red-fronted macaws  (Ara rubrogenys), endemic to a small mountainous area of Bolivia, can be observed in Mizque. This species is considered to be endangered due to intense agriculture activity which has reduced its habitat. The problem is that the peasants of some zones look upon them as a plague because they raid the maize in the fields. There is a chance that they might be regarded as one of the tourist attractions of the region.

Subdivision 
The province is divided into three municipalities which are further subdivided into ten cantons.

The people 
The majority of the population of the Mizque Province lives in the rural area in communities far apart from each other.  The lack of good roads makes trade and providing services difficult. The land in some areas is quite dry and not appropriate for farming.  That may be some of the reasons  why the Human Development Index in the municipalities of Mizque is among the lowest in Bolivia (0.365, 0.400 and 0.460), placing them in the positions 284 (Mizque), 305 (Vila Vila) and  298 (Alalay) out of 314 municipalities.

The conditions of life are especially critical in the puna and remote communities. The level of income of a peasant family in the high zones or in the dryland is estimated at 200 - 250 US-$ per year.

Some data:

There are 182 rural communities within the territory of the province situated in heights between 2,000 m in the template valleys and 3,600 m in the puna.

Language 
The predominant language is Quechua, spoken by 32,212 inhabitants and about 11,482 inhabitants are bilingual. They can speak Spanish as well. The following table shows the number of those belonging to the recognized group of speakers.

Economy 
The economic activity is concentrated on agriculture and animal husbandry and to a minor extent on mining and crafts. The most important sectors in agriculture are the cultivation of potatoes, maize, wheat, peanuts, barley and onions.

Festivals and Fairs 
 2nd week in May: Fruit fair in Mizque, 1 day
 July 16: Our Lady of Mount Carmel in Alalay, 3 days
 September 8–14: Our Lord of Burgos (Señor de Burgos) in Mizque, 7 days
 September 23–25: Virgen Mestiza de Shikimira in Vila Vila, 3 days

References 

 Global Program of Development (Spanish)

External links
 Education: Statistical Data of Mizque Municipality
 Education: Statistical Data of Vila Vila Municipality
 Education: Statistical Data of Alalay Municipality
 Mizque and Campero Province

Provinces of Cochabamba Department